Calathus ravasinii is a species of ground beetle from the Platyninae subfamily that can be found in Albania, Greece and North Macedonia.

References

ravasinii
Beetles described in 1935
Beetles of Europe